Kelayeh-ye Sofla (also Romanized as Kelāyeh-ye Soflá) is a village in Dehdasht-e Sharqi Rural District, in the Central District of Kohgiluyeh County, Kohgiluyeh and Boyer-Ahmad Province, Iran. At the 2006 census, its population was 1,551, in 267 families.

References 

Populated places in Kohgiluyeh County